This is a list of optical disc authoring software.

Open source

Multi-platform
 cdrtools, a comprehensive command line-based set of tools for creating and burning CDs, DVDs and Blu-rays
 cdrkit, a fork of cdrtools by the Debian project
 cdrdao, open source software for authoring and ripping of CDs in Disk-At-Once mode
 DVDStyler, a GUI-based DVD authoring tool
 libburnia, a collection of command line-based tools and libraries for burning discs

Linux and Unix
 Brasero, a GNOME disc burning utility
 dvd+rw-tools, a package for DVD and Blu-ray writing on Unix and Unix-like systems
 K3b, the KDE disc authoring program
 Nautilus, the GNOME file manager (includes basic disc burning capabilities)
 Serpentine, the GNOME audio CD burning utility
 Xfburn, the Xfce disc burning program
 X-CD-Roast

Windows 
 InfraRecorder (based on cdrkit and cdrtools)
 DVD Flick (ImgBurn is included)

Freeware

Windows
 CDBurnerXP
 ImgBurn
 Ashampoo Burning Studio
 DeepBurner Free
 DVD Decrypter
 DVD Shrink

macOS
 Disco

Commercial proprietary

macOS
 Adobe Encore
 DVD Studio Pro
 MacTheRipper
 Roxio Toast

Linux
 Nero Linux

Windows
 Adobe Encore
 Alcohol 120%
 Ashampoo Burning Studio
 AVS Video Editor
 Blindwrite
 CDRWIN
 CloneCD
 CloneDVD
 DeepBurner
 DiscJuggler
 Roxio Creator
 MagicISO
 Nero Burning ROM
 Netblender
 SEBAS
 UltraISO

See also
 Comparison of disc authoring software

 
Optical disc authoring software
Optical disc authoring

es:Programas grabadores de discos ópticos